Netaji Palkar is a 1927 Indian biopic historical silent film directed by V. Shantaram. Kaishavrao Dhaiber who was an apprentice with Damle, co-directed the film. He was to become the chief cinematographer for Shantaram in his later films. Made under the Maharashtra Film Company, Kolhapur, it was the first film directed by Shantaram. The director of photography was S. Fattelal and the cast included Ansuya, Balasaheb Yadav, Ganpat Bakre and Zunzarrao Pawar.

The film, based on the Maratha King Shivaji's Senapati (Commander-in-Chief) Netaji Palkar, and his struggle to save his kingdom, is cited to have made a great "impact" on Marathi Cinema. According to Garga, the commercial success of the film helped save the Maharashtra Film Company from facing bankruptcy.

Cast
 Balasaheb Yadav
 Sushila Devi
 Zunzharrao Pawar
 Anasuya
 Ganpat Bakre
 Mane
 Gulabbai
 Vasantrao Deshpande

References

External links

1927 films
1940s Hindi-language films
Indian silent films
Films directed by V. Shantaram
Indian black-and-white films
1920s historical films
Indian historical films
Cultural depictions of Shivaji